Numa Falls is a waterfall of the Vermilion River located in Kootenay National Park, British Columbia, Canada.

It is accessible via a short drive off the Banff–Windermere Highway 93 that connects Banff National Park and Radium Hot Springs. While not a large waterfall, it is easily accessible directly by the roadside, travelling south from Marble Canyon.

See also
Helmet Falls

External links

Waterfalls of British Columbia
Kootenay National Park